Tahli Gill (born 8 September 1999) is an Australian curler who resides in Brisbane. She currently skips her own team and plays mixed doubles with partner Dean Hewitt.

Career
Gill started curling at age 11. Her mother Lynette is also a curler, as well as Tahli's sisters Kirby and Jayna. The four Gills sometimes play together, such as when they, along with Laurie Weeden, won the 2018 Australian Women's Championship. They then represented Australia at the 2018 Pacific-Asia Championship, where they finished in sixth place out of the seven teams.

At the 2019 World Mixed Doubles Championship, Gill and her teammate Dean Hewitt made it to the semifinals before being eliminated by Sweden's Anna Hasselborg and Oskar Eriksson. In the bronze medal match, they again lost to John Shuster and Cory Christensen from the United States. Their fourth-place finish is the best finish ever for an Australian team at any world curling championship.

Gill focused on mixed doubles for the 2019–20 season, placing second at the New Zealand Winter Games and winning the WCT Pacific Ocean Cup, a World Curling Tour (WCT) event. Gill and Hewitt were qualified for the 2020 World Mixed Doubles Championship, but the event was cancelled due to the COVID-19 pandemic.

At the 2021 Olympic Curling Qualification Event in December 2021, Gill and her teammate Dean Hewitt made history when they won qualification to the mixed doubles tournament at the 2022 Winter Olympics. They are the first ever Australian curling team (in any curling discipline) to qualify for the Winter Olympics.

Personal life
Outside of curling, Gill worked in a gelateria and is currently a student. She attended the Queensland University of Technology.

Teams

Women's

Mixed doubles

References

External links

Living people
Australian female curlers
Australian curling champions
1999 births
Sportspeople from Brisbane
Sportspeople from Sydney
Curlers at the 2022 Winter Olympics
Olympic curlers of Australia
Competitors at the 2023 Winter World University Games
Queensland University of Technology alumni